Coming Out Party may refer to:

Films
 Coming Out Party, a 1934 American comedy film directed by John G. Blystone
 A Coming Out Party, a 1961 British comedy film directed by Ken Annakin
 Coming Out Party, a 2003 film with René Hicks and directed by Rich Tackenberg

Other uses
 Coming out party, a traditional term for debutante's ball